Trichosanthes cochinchinensis is a climbing plant in the family Cucurbitaceae, but the name may be unresolved, with The Plant List indicating that Gymnopetalum cochinchinense is a synonym of G. chinense (Lour.) Merr.  No subspecies are listed in the Catalogue of Life, which records its distribution as: China (Guangxi, Guangdong, Hainan, Yunnan), India (including South Andaman, North Nicobar), Nepal to Assam, Bhutan, Myanmar, Indonesia (Java, Sumatra, Sulawesi, Lesser Sunda Islands), Peninsular Malaysia, Borneo, Singapore, Java, Philippines, Laos, Thailand and Vietnam.  In Vietnamese its name is dây cứt quạ.

Description 
Under the name "G. cochinchinensis" this plant has been described as having: incised pubescent leaves, white single flowers (circa 30 mm diameter) and red/red-orange fruit which are typically 30–50 mm long with approximately 10 ribs.

References

External links
 
 

cochinchinensis
Flora of tropical Asia